I Decide (stylized as i DECIDE) is the third extended play by South Korean boy band iKON. It is the first release of the band since the departure of B.I on June 12, 2019. It was released by YG Entertainment on February 6, 2020. The mini-album includes a total of five tracks, including the lead single "Dive".

Background and release 
On January 21, 2020, YG Entertainment announced the return of iKON on February 6 titled "I Decide" as well as a concept teaser for the EP. Two days later, a video teaser titled "Definition of 'i Decide'" was released through the band's official YouTube channel. The main poster was released in January 29. The next day, the label announced the name of the lead single of the album threw a title poster: "Dive". On January 31, a concept film for the song was released threw iKON's YouTube channel. The next day, the tracklist for the EP was released the name of the five tracks. On February 2, individual teaser pictures with lyrics for "Dive" were released in two versions: Red and Black. On February 3, the band released a first trailer of the music video for "Dive". The following day, iKON released a sampler for their album as well as a mood clip of the music video for the title track. The second trailer for "Dive" was uploaded on February 5 on their YouTube channel.

The EP was released in February 5 in CD and digital formats. The accompanying music video for "Dive" was released at the same time on their official YouTube channel.

Composition 
Among the five songs included in the album, four of them were written and composed by ex-member B.I, including the title track "Dive".

Member Bobby participated in writing the lyrics for the songs "Ah Yeah", "All the World" and "Flower" while DK co-wrote the lyrics for "Flower" among with him and composed it as well.

Commercial performance 
I Decide debuted at number 3 on the Gaon Album Chart in South Korea, selling 55,254 copies. In Japan, the mini-album debuted at number 15 on the Oricon Albums Chart, selling 1,000 digital copies and 3,306 physical copies in the country. It also debuted at number 5 on the Download Albums and number 16 ont the Hot Albums on Billboard Japan.

Track listing 
Credits adapted from YG Entertainment's official website.

Charts

Release history

References

2020 EPs
Korean-language EPs
YG Entertainment EPs
Genie Music EPs
IKon albums